The Girl in the Night is a 1931 British crime film directed by Henry Edwards and starring Edwards, Dorothy Boyd and Sam Livesey. It was made at Elstree Studios. It was released as a quota quickie.

Cast
 Henry Edwards as Billie  
 Dorothy Boyd as Cecile  
 Sam Livesey as Ephraim Tucker  
 Reginald Bach as Schmidt  
 Eric Maturin as Fenton  
 Diana Wilson as Mrs. Fenton  
 Charles Paton as Prof. Winthrop  
 Harvey Braban as Inspector 
 Hal Gordon

References

Bibliography
 Chibnall, Steve. Quota Quickies: The Birth of the British 'B' Film. British Film Institute, 2007.
 Low, Rachael. Filmmaking in 1930s Britain. George Allen & Unwin, 1985.
 Wood, Linda. British Films, 1927-1939. British Film Institute, 1986.

External links

1931 films
British crime films
1931 crime films
Films directed by Henry Edwards
Films shot at British International Pictures Studios
Films set in England
British black-and-white films
1930s English-language films
1930s British films
Quota quickies